Cara Black and Rennae Stubbs were the defending champions, but Stubbs did not compete this year. Black teamed up with Liezel Huber and lost in quarterfinals to tournament runners-up Lindsay Davenport and Corina Morariu.

Janette Husárová and Elena Likhovtseva won the title by defeating Davenport and Morariu 6–4, 6–3 in the final.

Seeds

Draw

Draw

References
 Main and Qualifying Rounds

2005 Doubles
Toray Pan Pacific Open - Doubles
2005 Toray Pan Pacific Open